Alex Pires de Souza (born January 8, 1991), is a Brazilian footballer who played for Al Wasl FC in the United Arab Emirates, as well as other teams in Brazil. He now plays for Kochi United SC in the Japanese Shikoku Soccer League.

External links
 Alex De Souza profile on UFL

References 

1991 births
Living people
Brazilian footballers
Brazilian expatriate footballers
Fluminense FC players
Al-Wasl F.C. players
Brazilian expatriate sportspeople in the United Arab Emirates
Expatriate footballers in the United Arab Emirates
UAE Pro League players
Association football forwards